The Mecca Metro or Makkah Metro is a metro system with four planned lines in the city of Mecca, Saudi Arabia. The Metro was constructed by China Railway Construction Corporation and is run by Mecca Mass Rail Transit Company (MMRTC). The metro forms part of the 62-billion-riyal Mecca Public Transport Programe (MPTP), which will include integrated bus services.

The four new metro lines will be in addition to the existing Al Mashaer Al Mugaddassah Metro line: 18.1 km, connecting Mecca, Arafat, Muzdalifa, and Mina opened in November 2010.

Many people utilize the Mecca Metro during the Hajj. The price for the metro is 250 riyals, with prices lowering to 100 riyals if traveling on the last day of Hajj.

Planning
In August 2012, it was announced that the Saudi government had approved a US$16.5 billion budget to build the four metro lines ( long) of the system. The announcement gave an estimated time period to completion of 10 years. Invitations for tenders were due to be issued in January 2013.

Four new lines are to be built. Work had been expected to commence construction in 2015:

Line  : will connect Mecca to large multilevel parking facilities from the west to the south.
Line  : is a straight link between Mina and Mecca.
Line  : will connect Mina to the west side of Mecca through a big loop to the north.
Line  : circles Mecca with a straight extension to the north.

MMRTC has appointed Prasarana Malaysia to provide consultancy services during Phase 1, which covers the construction of two metro lines; totaling 45·1  km and 22 stations by 2019.

However, as of February 2017, construction contracts had still not yet been awarded. As of June 2017, construction contracts are expected to be awarded in 2018.

See also
Jeddah Metro
Madinah Metro
Riyadh Metro
Haramain High Speed Rail Project
Al Mashaaer Al Mugaddassah Metro line

References

External links

 Makkah at UrbanRail.net

 
Rapid transit in Saudi Arabia
Proposed rapid transit
Proposed rail infrastructure in Saudi Arabia